Stéphane Huet (born 25 April 1971) is a former professional tennis player from France.

Huet appeared in a total of 16 Grand Slam tournaments during his career. When he made his Grand Slam tournament debut in the 1993 French Open, as a qualifier, he was ranked 297 in the world and had just one tour match to his name. Despite this, in the opening round he managed to defeat seventh-seed Ivan Lendl in four sets. It was the first time since 1978 that Lendl, a three-time French Open winner, had exited the tournament without registering a win. In 1999, Huet made the second round of two Majors, the Australian Open, where he beat Arnaud Di Pasquale and the French Open, where he defeated Hendrik Dreekmann, before losing a five set match to eventual finalist Todd Martin, in a final set tie-break. The Frenchman reached the second round on two further occasions, the 2000 Wimbledon Championships, when he defeated Mahesh Bhupathi, and at the same event a year later, when he had a victory against Markus Hipfl. He also played men's doubles twice and mixed doubles at four Major tournaments.

On the ATP Tour, he was a quarter-finalist at Toulouse in 1998 and also reached the quarter-finals stage at Palermo two years later. In the 2000 Tashkent Open he had a win over Carlos Moyá.

As a coach his students include the French players Irena Pavlovic, Laetitia Sarrazin and Manon Arcangioli.

Challenger titles

Singles: (2)

References

1971 births
Living people
French male tennis players
French tennis coaches
Tennis players from Paris